Antonio Martini (b. at Prato in Tuscany, 20 April 1720; d. at Florence, 31 December 1809) was an Italian biblical scholar and Archbishop of Florence. His translation of the Bible in Italian, formally approved by the papacy, was widely used in Italy for about two centuries.

Life
Having received holy Orders, he was appointed director of the Superga College at Turin. Cardinal Carlo Vittorio Amedeo delle Lanze, knowing that Pope Benedict XIV desired a good version of the Bible in the contemporary Tuscan language, urged Martini to undertake the work.

He began a translation of the New Testament but found the work with his duties in the Superga beyond his physical strength. He accordingly resigned the directorship and accepted from the King Charles Emmanuel III of Sardinia a state councillorship together with a pension. In spite of some discouragement upon the decease of Benedict XIV, Martini persevered, completing the publication of the New Testament in 1771. In his work upon the Hebrew text of the Old Testament, which followed, he was assisted by the rabbi Terni, a Jewish scholar.

The whole work was approved, and Martini personally commended, by Pope Pius VI, who made him archbishop of Florence in 1781. As archbishop he succeeded in partly foiling an attempt to publish a garbled edition of his work, and a third authorized edition issued from Archiepiscopal Press of Florence in 1782-92.

See also
Bible translations (Italian)

References 
 Begagli, Biografia degli uomini illustri (Venice 1840)
 Minocchi in Fulcran Vigouroux, Dictionnaire de la Bible, s.v. Italiennes (Versions) de la Bible

External links
biographic information

1720 births
1809 deaths
Italian biblical scholars
Roman Catholic archbishops of Florence
18th-century Italian Roman Catholic archbishops
19th-century Italian Roman Catholic archbishops
Translators of the Bible into Italian
18th-century translators